The Sparrow House is an historic house at 35 Arlington Street in the Woodford's Corner and Back Cove neighborhood of Portland, Maine.  Built in 1852, it is a well-preserved example of Gothic Revival architecture.  It was listed on the National Register of Historic Places in 1982.

Description and history
The Sparrow House is set on the northwest side of Arlington Street, a residential street between Forest Avenue and Back Cove in Portland's Woodford's Corner neighborhood.  It is a -story wood-frame structure, with a steeply pitched gable roof and vertical board siding.  The side gables and a front-facing gable above the entrance are decorated with intricate bargeboard. The front gable has a Palladian-style three-part window formed out of narrow lancet-arched windows.  A single-story (ell) extends to the right of the main block.

The house was built in 1852, when the area was part of Deering, and was for a number of years the only house in the area.  It was built for Warren Sparrow, a Portland businessman who operated a dry goods store and insurance business, and was one of the early organizers of Portland's streetcar system.  It is along with The Gothic House in Portland's West End, one of the finest examples of Gothic residential architecture in the city.  Its architect is unknown.

See also
National Register of Historic Places listings in Portland, Maine

References

Houses on the National Register of Historic Places in Maine
Houses in Portland, Maine
National Register of Historic Places in Portland, Maine
Houses completed in 1852
1852 establishments in Maine